Ignazio Messina (born 24 July 1964) is an Italian lawyer and politician. He is the current leader of Italy of Values.

Biography
Ignazio Messina was born in Palermo on 24 July 1964, from a family of magistrates and University professors. 
In 1991 he was one of the founders of The Network, political party led by Leoluca Orlando, and was candidate in the Sicilian regional election, without being elected. In 1993 he was elected Major of Sciacca and was confirmed again in 1997.
In 1998 he joined Italy of Values, party led by the former magistrate Antonio Di Pietro. In 1999 his mandate as Mayor was interrupted by a motion of distrust approved by the City Council; Leoluca Orlando held a meeting to defend Messina and accused the city councilors of collusion with the mafia: for that event Orlando was condemned, with a final sentence, for defamation.

In the general election of 2001 Messina was candidate for the Chamber of Deputies, but he was not elected.

In 2004 he was again a candidate for Mayor of Sciacca, but did not win the election. In the general election of 2006 he was candidate for the Senate, but he was not elected even on that occasion.
Messina succeeded for the first time in being elected parliamentary Deputy in the 2008 general election.

In 2013 he joined the political alliance Civil Revolution for the 2013 election, but RC did not reached the minimum threshold and Messina lost his seat.
In June 2013 he was elected National Secretary of the IdV replacing the outgoing leader Antonio Di Pietro.

In the 2018 general election Messina was candidate for the Senate in the uninominal constituency of Brescia, supported by the centre-left coalition, but he was not elected.

References

External links 
 Personal website

1964 births
Living people
Politicians from Palermo
The Network (political party) politicians
Italy of Values politicians
Deputies of Legislature XVI of Italy